Batchawana Bay is an unincorporated place and Compact Rural Community in Algoma District in Northeastern Ontario, Canada. It is also the name of a local services board, consisting of parts of the geographic townships of Fisher, Herrick, Ryan and Tilley. It is located north of Sault Ste. Marie, Ontario, on the shores of Batchawana Bay off Lake Superior.

The area is counted as part of Unorganized North Algoma District in Statistics Canada census data.

Batchawana Bay Provincial Park is nearby along Highway 17; the community itself is reached from Highway 17 by Ontario Highway 563.

See also

 List of unincorporated communities in Ontario

References

Communities in Algoma District
Local services boards in Ontario
Populated places on Lake Superior in Canada